Wait to be Written (born 1995) is a female Hong Kongese web novelist known for writing sci-fi and fantasy fiction.

Biography 
Wait to be Written was born in Hong Kong in 1995 and later graduated from university with a bachelor's degree in English. She became interested in Hong Kong literature during her university years, which inspired her in writing and her writing style is strongly influenced by renowned local writers, such as Liu Yichang and Dung Kai-cheung. She wrote and published her first novel, The Boy who loves Eason Chan's songs (Chinese: 愛聽陳奕迅的男孩——講一個第三者的故事), on HKGolden and LIHKG in 2014. In 2017, she published Regret Amending Yorozuya (Chinese: 遺憾修正萬事屋), an urban fantasy novel which became viral on the internet and received positive reception from the netizens. A paperback version was published in the same year, and the first edition had already sold out during the annual Hong Kong Book Fair. The novel had also been adapted into a stageplay and radio drama by 57 Studio and CUHK Campus Radio respectively. Three more novels which share a similar setting with Regret Amending Yorozuya were published in 2018, 2019 and 2021, namely We Met For Our Sins (Chinese:孽債府), Short Tour (Chinese: 時光短路) and Trust Receiver's Office (Chinese: 誠信破產管理局).

Aside from writing web novels, Wait to be Written also served as an administrative executive for an acting company.

Personal life 
Wait to be Written was married to writer and former district councilor Franco Cheung in 2020 and they migrated to the United Kingdom in 2021.

Bibliography 
Regret Amending Yorozuya (遺憾修正萬事屋; 2017) 
We Met For Our Sins (孽債府; 2018) 
Hanami (花見; 2019) 
Short Tour (時光短路; 2019) 
Atonement Psychology (人格試驗; 2020) 
Trust Receiver's Office (誠信破產管理局; 2021) 
Second Her Second Life (第二人妻; 2022) 
Fortūna (命運列車; 2022)

References

External links 
 
 

Hong Kong women writers
Hong Kong novelists